Geoffrey Treadwell (21 September 1892 – 12 August 1967) was a South African cricket umpire. He stood in four Test matches between 1927 and 1930.

See also
 List of Test cricket umpires

References

1892 births
1967 deaths
People from Orpington
South African Test cricket umpires
British emigrants to South Africa